The Evangelical-Reformed Church of Appenzell is a Reformed state church in Appenzell, Switzerland. In 2004 it had 30,151 members and 20 parishes and 26 house fellowships, served by 21 pastors. Member of the Federation of Swiss Protestant Churches.
The church can be found all over Appenzell. Women ordination is allowed.

References

External links
Kirchgemeinde.ch/appenzell/

Appenzell Innerrhoden
Appenzell Inner